This is a list of all railway lines in Italy.

Active lines

Managed by Ferrovie dello Stato

High–speed lines 
 Turin–Milan
 Milan–Verona (under construction)
 Verona–Venice (under construction)
 Venice–Trieste (planning phase)
 Milan–Bologna
 Bologna–Florence
 Florence–Rome
 Rome–Naples
 Naples–Salerno
 Tortona–Genoa (under construction)

Major lines 
 Genoa–Pisa
 Ancona–Lecce
 Alessandria–Piacenza
 Bologna–Ancona
 Bologna–Florence
 Domodossola–Milan
 Florence–Pisa–Livorno
 Florence–Rome
 Gallarate–Laveno
 Genoa–Ventimiglia
 Milan–Bologna
 Milan–Chiasso
 Milan–Venice
 Milan–Genoa
 Naples–Foggia
 Naples–Salerno
 Parma–La Spezia
 Udine–Tarvisio
 Rome–Ancona
 Rome–Formia–Naples
 Rome–Cassino–Naples
 Rome–Livorno
 Salerno–Reggio Calabria
 Turin–Genoa
 Turin–Milan
 Turin–Modane
 Udine–Trieste
 Padua–Bologna
 Venice–Trieste
 Venice–Udine
 Verona–Bologna
 Verona–Brennero

Minor lines 
 Alessandria–Cavallermaggiore
 Alessandria–Novara–Arona
 Alessandria–Ovada
 Alessandria–San Giuseppe di Cairo
 Aosta–Pré-Saint-Didier
 Asciano–Monte Antico
 Ascoli Piceno–San Benedetto del Tronto
 Asti–Genoa
 Avellino–Rocchetta Sant'Antonio
 Avezzano–Sora–Roccasecca
 Bari–Taranto
 Barletta–Spinazzola
 Battipaglia–Potenza–Metaponto
 Benevento–Campobasso
 Bergamo–Brescia
 Biella–Novara
 Brescia–Cremona
 Cagliari–Golfo Aranci Marittima
 Calalzo–Padua
 Caltanissetta–Agrigento
 Campiglia Marittima–Piombino Marittima
 Campobasso–Termoli
 Cancello–Avellino
 Cancello–Benevento
 Carmagnola–Bra
 Casarsa–Portogruaro
 Castagnole–Asti–Mortara
 Castelbolognese–Ravenna
 Catania–Caltagirone–Gela
 Cecina–Volterra
 Ceva–Ormea
 Chivasso–Alessandria
 Chivasso–Asti
 Chivasso–Ivrea–Aosta
 Colico–Chiavenna
 Como–Lecco
 Cosenza–Sibari
 Cremona–Fidenza
 Cuneo–Limone–Ventimiglia
 Cuneo–Mondovì
 Decimomannu–Iglesias
 Civitanova Marche–Fabriano
 Empoli–Siena–Chiusi
 Faenza–Lavezzola
 Faenza–Ravenna
 Ferrandina–Matera
 Ferrara–Ravenna–Rimini
 Fidenza–Fornovo
 Fidenza–Salsomaggiore Terme
 Florence–Faenza
 Foggia–Manfredonia
 Foggia–Potenza
 Foligno–Terontola
 Franzensfeste–Innichen (Fortezza–San Candido)
 Gemona del Friuli–Pinzano
 Giulianova–Teramo
 Isernia–Campobasso
 Lamezia Terme–Catanzaro Lido
 Lecco–Bergamo
 Lecco–Milan
 Lucca–Aulla
 Lucca–Pisa
 Mantova–Monselice
 Messina–Syracuse
 Milan–Mortara
 Montebelluna–Camposampiero
 Monza–Molteno
 Novara–Gozzano–Domodossola
 Novara–Luino
 Novara–Varallo
 Ozieri Chilivani–Porto Torres Marittima
 Padova–Bassano
 Palermo–Agrigento–Porto Empedocle
 Palermo–Catania
 Palermo–Messina
 Palermo–Trapani
 Pavia–Alessandria
 Paola–Cosenza
 Parma–Brescia
 Pavia–Stradella
 Pavia–Mantua
 Pavia–Mortara–Vercelli
 Pergola–Fabriano
 Piacenza–Cremona
 Pisa–Collesalvetti–Vada
 Pistoia–Bologna
 Ponte nelle Alpi–Conegliano
 Porto Ceresio–Milan
 Rocchetta Sant'Antonio–Gioia del Colle
 Rome–Capranica–Viterbo
 Rome–Fiumicino
 Rome–Frascati
 Rome–Sulmona–Pescara
 Rovigo–Chioggia
 Sacile–Pinzano
 Salerno–Mercato San Severino
 Santhià–Arona
 Santhià–Biella
 Savigliano–Saluzzo–Cuneo
 Seregno–Bergamo
 Siena–Grosseto
 Siracusa–Canicattì
 Sulmona–Isernia
 Taranto–Brindisi
 Taranto–Reggio Calabria
 Terni–Sulmona
 Terracina–Priverno
 Tirano–Lecco
 Turin–Fossano–Savona
 Turin–Pinerolo
 Torre Annunziata–Castellammare di Stabia–Gragnano
 Tortona–Novi Ligure
 Trento–Venice
 Treviglio–Bergamo
 Treviglio–Cremona
 Treviso–Portogruaro
 Trofarello–Chieri
 Udine–Cervignano
 Vairano–Isernia
 Vercelli–Casale–Valenza
 Verona–Legnago–Rovigo
 Verona–Mantova–Modena
Viareggio–Florence
 Vicenza–Schio
 Vicenza–Treviso
 Villamassargia–Carbonia
 Viterbo–Attigliano

Managed by other companies

Standard gauge

Managed by Gruppo Torinese Trasporti 

 Settimo Torinese–Pont Canavese
 Turin–Chieri
 Turin–Ceres railway

Managed by Ferrovie Nord Milano 

 Brescia–Iseo–Edolo
 Milan–Saronno
 Milan–Canzo–Asso
 Saronno–Como
 Novara–Seregno
 Saronno–Varese–Laveno

Managed by SAD 
 Val Venosta

Managed by Sistemi Territoriali 

 Adria–Mestre

Managed by Società Ferrovie Udine–Cividale 
 Udine–Cividale

Managed by Ferrovie Emilia Romagna 

 Bologna–Portomaggiore
 Casalecchio–Vignola
 Ferrara–Codigoro
 Modena–Sassuolo
 Parma–Suzzara
 Reggio Emilia–Ciano d'Enza
 Reggio Emilia–Guastalla
 Reggio Emilia–Sassuolo
 Suzzara–Ferrara

Managed by Umbria Mobilità 
 Terni–Perugia–Sansepolcro

Managed by La ria Italiana 
 Casentinese
 Arezzo–Sinalunga

Managed by ATAC 

 Rome–Civitacastellana–Viterbo
 Rome–Lido

Managed by  Adriatico Sangritana 

 Sangritana

Managed by Ente Autonomo Volturno 
 Naples–Piedimonte Matese
 Benevento–Cancello
 Naples–Pozzuoli–Torregaveta
 Naples–Licola–Torregaveta

Managed by Ferrovie del Gargano 
 Foggia–Lucera
 San Severo–Peschici

Managed by Ferrotramviaria 

 Bari–Barletta

Managed by Ferrovie del Sud Est 

 Bari–Casamassima–Putignano
 Bari–Martina Franca–Taranto
 Gallipoli–Casarano
 Lecce–Otranto
 Maglie–Gagliano
 Martina Franca–Lecce
 Novoli–Gagliano
 Zollino–Gallipoli

Narrow gauge

Managed by Ferrovie Appulo Lucane 
 Bari–Matera–Montalbano Jonico
 Altamura–Potenza
 Avigliano–Avigliano Città

Managed by FCE 
 Circumetnea

Managed by EAV 
Circumvesuviana:
 Naples–Pompei–Poggiomarino
 Naples–Ottaviano–Sarno
 Naples–Nola–Baiano
 Torre Annunziata–Sorrento
 Pomigliano d'Arco–Acerra
 Botteghelle–San Giorgio a Cremano

Managed by Ferrovie della Calabria 
 Cosenza–Catanzaro Lido
 Cosenza–Camigliatello Silano (currently inactive)
 Gioia Tauro–Cinquefrondi (currently inactive)
 Gioia Tauro–Palmi (currently inactive)

Managed by ARST 
 Macomer–Nuoro
 Monserrato–Isili
 Sassari–Alghero
 Sassari–Sorso

Managed by AMT Genova 
 Genova–Casella
 Principe–Granarolo

Managed by ATAC 
 Rome–Giardinetti

Managed by SAD 
 del Renon

Managed by SSIF 
 Domodossola–Locarno

Managed by Trentino Trasporti 
 Trento–Malé–Mezzana

Lines used exclusively for urban services 
 Rome Metro
 Milan Metro
 Naples Metro
 Naples–Giugliano–Aversa
 Turin Metro
 Genoa Metro
 Bari Metro
 Catania Metro
 Brescia Metro
 Cosenza Metro (in planning phase)
 Catanzaro Metro (under construction and renovation)

Touristic lines 
 FTI – Ferrovie Turistiche Italiane
 Ferrovie della Sardegna–Trenino Verde
 Ferrovie della Calabria–Trenino della Sila
 Fondazione FS

Inactive lines

Decommissioned

Previously managed by Ferrovie dello Stato 
 Agrigento–Naro–Licata
 Airasca–Saluzzo
 Albano–Nettuno
 Alcantara–Randazzo
 Asciano–Monte Antico
 Avenza–Carrara
 Bastia Mondovì–Mondovì
 Bivio Mirano–Bivio Carpenedo
 Bricherasio–Barge
 Brunico–Campo Tures
 Busca–Dronero
 Castelvetrano–Porto Empedocle
 Cava Carbonara–Cava Manara
 Cerignola Campagna–Cerignola Città
 Cervignano–Aquileia–Pontile per Grado
 Chiusa–Plan
 Como–Varese
 Cuneo–Boves–Borgo San Dalmazzo
 Desenzano–Desenzano Porto
 Dittaino–Leonforte
 Dittaino–Piazza Armerina–Caltagirone
 Ellera–Tavernelle
 Fano–Urbino
 Gemona del Friuli–Casarsa
 Lercara–Filaga–Magazzolo
 Lonigo–Lonigo Città
 Lucca–Pontedera
 Margherita di Savoia Ofantino–Margherita di Savoia
 Mezzocorona–Mezzolombardo
 Montebelluna–Susegana
 Moretta–Cavallermaggiore
 Motta Sant'Anastasia–Regalbuto
 Noto–Pachino
 Palazzolo–Paratico
 Palermo–Corleone–San Carlo
 Palo–Ladispoli
 Palmanova–San Giorgio di Nogaro
 Pisa Centrale–Pisa Aeroporto
 Poggibonsi–Colle Val d'Elsa
 Rezzato–Vobarno
 Rome San Pietro–Vigna Clara
 Rovereto–Arco–Riva
 San Giovanni Suergiu–Iglesias
 Sangritana
 San Vito al Tagliamento–Motta di Livenza
 Santa Ninfa–Salemi
 Sparanise–Gaeta
 Spinazzola–Spinazzola Città
 Urbino–Fabriano
 Velletri–Segni
 Velletri–Terracina
 Tarvisio–Lubiana
 Treviso–Ostiglia
 Trieste–Buie–Parenzo
 Trieste–Erpelle
 Trieste Campo Marzio Smistamento–Trieste Centrale Scalo

Previously managed by other companies 
 Turin Monorail
 Adria–Ariano Polesine
 Agnone–Pescolanciano
 Arezzo–Fossato di Vico
 Atena Lucana–Marsico Nuovo
 Bagnolo in Piano–Carpi
 Barco–Montecchio
 Bari–Matera–Montalbano Jonico
 Bergamo–Clusone
 Bergamo–Piazza Brembana
 Biella–Balma
 Biella–Cossato–Vallemosso
 Biella–Mongrando
 Bitonto–Santo Spirito
 Bribano–Agordo
 Bolzano–Caldaro
 Budrio–Massalombarda
 Calalzo–Dobbiaco
 Cana–Arcille–Grosseto
 Cana–Arcille–Rispescia
 Carnia–Tolmezzo–Villa Santina
 Castel Bolognese–Riolo Bagni
 Castelraimondo–Camerino
 Castellanza–Mendrisio
 Chieti città–Chieti stazione
 Cividale–Caporetto
 Cividale–Tarcetta
 Cogne–Acque Fredde
 Cremona–Iseo
 Crotone–Petilia Policastro
 Crotone–Timpa Grande
 Milan Expo Railway
 Ferrara–Copparo
 Ferrara–Modena
 Frugarolo–Basaluzzo
 Gairo Taquisara–Jerzu
 decauville Gariglione–Differenze
 Genova Terralba–Acciaieria Falck
 Ghirla–Ponte Tresa
 Gioiosa Jonica–Mammola
 Gozzano–Alzo
 Grignasco–Coggiola
 Intra–Premeno
 Isili–Villacidro
 L'Aquila–Capitignano
 La Spezia Centrale–Arsenale
 La Thuile–Arpy
 Lagonegro–Castrovillari–Spezzano Albanese
 Lana di Sopra–Postal
 Macomer–Bosa
 Mandela–Subiaco
 Mantova–Peschiera
 Marmifera Privata di Carrara
 Massa Marittima–Follonica
 Massalombarda–Imola–Fontanelice
 Menaggio–Porlezza
 Modena–Mirandola
 Modena–Vignola
 Monteponi–Portovesme
 Montepulciano–Fontago
 di Monterufoli
 Montevecchio Sciria–San Gavino Monreale
 Monti–Tempio
 Macomer–Nuoro
 Ora–Predazzo
 Orbetello–Porto Santo Stefano
 Padova–Piazzola–Carmignano
 Pescara–Penne
 Piacenza–Bettola
 Pisa–Tirrenia–Livorno
 Ponte Tresa–Luino
 Porto San Giorgio–Amandola
 Portomaggiore–Bando
 Potenza–Pignola–Laurenzana
 Pracchia–San Marcello Pistoiese–Mammiano
 Precenicco–Gemona del Friuli
 Pugliano–Vesuvio
 Rocchette–Arsiero
 Rocchette–Asiago
 Rome–Fiuggi–Alatri–Frosinone
 Reggio Emilia–Boretto
 Rimini–Novafeltria
 Rimini–San Marino
 Sacile–Vittorio Veneto
 Sant'Ellero–Saltino
 Sassari–Alghero
 Schio–Rocchette
 mineraria Sikelia
 Siliqua–San Giovanni Suergiu–Calasetta
 Siracusa–Ragusa–Vizzini
 Soverato–Chiaravalle Centrale
 Spezzano–Zoccalia
 Spoleto–Norcia
 Stresa–Mottarone
 Susa–Saint–Michel–de–Maurienne
 Thiene–Rocchette
 Tirso–Chilivani
 Tolmezzo–Paluzza–Moscardo
 Torrebelvicino–Schio
 Tortona–Castelnuovo Scrivia
 Varese–Luino
 Verona–Caprino–Garda
 Vibo Valentia–Mileto
 Villa Santina–Comeglians
 Villamar–Ales
 Voghera–Varzi

Unused

Managed by Ferrovie dello Stato 
 Civitavecchia–Orte
 Santo Stefano di Magra–Sarzana
 Sulmona–Isernia

Managed by other companies 
 Gioia Tauro–Cinquefrondi

Unfinished or never put in use 
 Bertiolo–Palmanova–Savogna
 Bivio Orba–Felizzano
 Bronte–Cuccovia
 Canicattì–Caltagirone
 Cormons–Redipuglia
 Ferrandina–Matera
 Formigine–Pavullo
 Kaggera–Salemi
 Leonforte–Nicosia
 Palermo Lolli–Camporeale–Salaparuta
 Rolo–Mirandola
 Rome Nomentana–Rome San Pietro
 Santo Stefano di Camastra–Mistretta
 Santarcangelo di Romagna–Urbino
 Teglio Veneto–Bertiolo–Udine
 Torpignattara–Piazza Santa Croce
 Udine–Castions
 Udine–Majano
 Vigna Clara–Rome Smistamento

References 

 
Italy
Lines